The 1890 international cricket season was from April 1890 to September 1890. The season consisted of a single international tour, visiting with Australia  England for The Ashes series famously known as The greats: Grace v Murdoch 1890.

Season overview

July

Australia in England

See also
 History of Test cricket from 1890 to 1900

References

International cricket competitions by season
1890 in cricket